Sunway Lagoon is  a bus rapid transit station in Bandar Sunway, Subang Jaya, Selangor, Malaysia on the BRT Sunway Line. Like other stations, this station is elevated. However, it is painted differently; in orange, to fit in with the surroundings.

The station is located nearby and connected to the water theme park, Sunway Lagoon which it is named after and Sunway Pyramid, a shopping mall, both which are connected through a 300 meter skyway. The station is also surrounded by hotels and shoplots. The station helps to serve this area.

Gallery

References 

Bus rapid transit in Malaysia
Buildings and structures in Selangor
2015 establishments in Malaysia